Diaboleite is a blue-colored mineral with formula Pb2CuCl2(OH)4. It was discovered in England in 1923 and named diaboleite, from the Greek word διά and boleite, meaning "distinct from boleite". The mineral has since been found in a number of countries.

Description

Diaboleite is deep blue in color and pale blue in transmitted light. Vicinal forms of the tabular crystals have a square or octagonal outline and rarely exhibit pyramidal hemihedralism.

Formation
Diaboleite occurs in manganese oxide ores, as a secondary mineral in lead and copper oxide ores, and in seawater-exposed slag. Diaboleite has been found in association with atacamite, boleite, caledonite, cerussite, chloroxiphite, hydrocerussite, leadhillite, mendipite, paratacamite, phosgenite, and wherryite.

At higher temperatures, the first stable mineral to form is cumengeite.

History
In 1923, diaboleite was discovered at Higher Pitts Mine in the Mendip Hills of Somerset, England, and described by L. J. Spencer and E.D. Mountain. The study of the similar mineral boleite was perplexing at the time and this new mineral only compounded the difficulty. As insufficient material was available for a full investigation, Spencer and Mountain named it diaboleite, meaning "distinct from boleite", out of "desperation".

The mineral was grandfathered as a valid mineral by the International Mineralogical Association as it was described prior to 1959.

Distribution
, diaboleite has been found in Australia, Austria, Chile, France, Germany, Greece, Iran, Italy, Russia, South Africa, the UK and the US. The type material is held at the Natural History Museum in London and the National Museum of Natural History in Washington, D.C.

References
Citations

Bibliography

Further reading

External links

Copper(II) minerals
Halide minerals
Hydroxide minerals
Lead minerals
Tetragonal minerals
Minerals in space group 99